Robert Markham (1536–1606) was an English politician.

He was born the eldest son of John Markham of Cotham, Nottinghamshire.

He was appointed a Justice of the Peace (J.P.) for Nottinghamshire from 1564 and High Sheriff of Nottinghamshire for 1571–2 and 1583–4.

He was a Member (MP) of the Parliament of England for Nottinghamshire in 1571 and 1589 and Grantham in 1586.

He married twice: firstly Mary, the daughter of Francis Leck of Sutton in the Dale, Derbyshire with whom he had five sons and three daughters; and secondly Jane, the daughter of William Burnell of Winkburn.

References

1536 births
1606 deaths
People from Newark and Sherwood (district)
High Sheriffs of Nottinghamshire
English MPs 1571
English MPs 1586–1587
English MPs 1589